Kunkush (Ancash Quechua for Puya raimondii, also spelled Cuncush) is a mountain in the Andes of Peru which reaches a height of approximately . It is located in the Ancash Region, Huari Province, Paucas District.

References

Mountains of Peru
Mountains of Ancash Region